Deborah Knox MBE (born 26 September 1968 in Dunfermline) is a British curler from Lochgelly, Scotland. She is best known for being part of the British curling team that won gold in the 2002 winter Olympics.

In the 2002 Olympics, Knox played third for Rhona Martin. She was also a member of the team again at the 2006 Winter Olympics as an alternate, however the team did not medal.

She was appointed Member of the Order of the British Empire (MBE) in the 2002 Birthday Honours.

References

External links
 

1968 births
Living people
People from Lochgelly
Scottish female curlers
British female curlers
Olympic curlers of Great Britain
Olympic gold medallists for Great Britain
Olympic medalists in curling
Curlers at the 1992 Winter Olympics
Curlers at the 2006 Winter Olympics
Curlers at the 2002 Winter Olympics
Medalists at the 2002 Winter Olympics
Scottish curling champions
Scottish curling coaches
Scottish Olympic medallists
Continental Cup of Curling participants
Members of the Order of the British Empire